Péter Ovádi (born in Veszprém, Hungary on October 22 , 1981) is a Hungarian computer scientist and politician. He is a member of parliament in the National Assembly of Hungary (Országgyűlés) since May 2018. He has been a member of the legislative committee of the National Assembly and the Committee on Enterprise Development since 8 May.

References 

Living people
1981 births
People from Veszprém
Hungarian politicians
21st-century Hungarian politicians
Members of the National Assembly of Hungary (2018–2022)
Members of the National Assembly of Hungary (2022–2026)